Technology Park Malaysia (TPM) is a science park located in Bukit Jalil, Kuala Lumpur, Malaysia for research and development of knowledge-based industries. It is in phase 1 of implementation.

Since its establishment, it provides support services, technology and R&D capability to stimulate the growth of science, technology and innovation. This includes rental of incubator premises to scientist, researchers, technopreneurs and SMEs, and lease of land parcels for technology knowledge-based companies. TPM also provides technology and business incubation programs including business mentoring and coaching services, marketing and financial consulting, technology and business forums, workshops and business matching.

Other services include technology commercialization assistance to support to the commercialization of technology, including advisory and consultancy of technology transfer, project management, strategic management counsel, market research and opportunity analysis, and professional development programs.

Subsidiaries
TPM Engineering Sdn Bhd
TPM Nexus Sdn Bhd
TPM IT Sdn Bhd

List of companies in TPM

Astro All Asia Networks
Asia Pacific University of Technology & Innovation
MIMOS
IRIS Corporation Berhad
HexoSys SDN BHD
HCL Axon Malaysia SDN BHD
Software International Corporation SDN BHD
ACE Training Malaysia
Synergy Log In Systems Sdn Bhd

Facilities & Services
Co-working space
Conference Area
Small to medium scale meeting rooms
Auditoriums
Multi-function exhibition area
Gymnasium
Indoor and outdoor game facilities
Technoflex (Recreation Centre)
High speed internet
Cafes and food court
Auxiliary Police surveillance
Ample parking space
Medical clinics

See also
 Cyberjaya

References

Minister of Finance (Incorporated) (Malaysia)
1995 establishments in Malaysia
Science parks in Malaysia
Buildings and structures in Kuala Lumpur
Ministry of Energy, Technology, Science, Climate Change and Environment (Malaysia)
MSC Malaysia